Hidden Sequence is a Korean drama production company, founded by Misaeng and Signal producer Lee Jae-moon in December 2016 shortly after he resigned from the cable network tvN.

List of works

Drama

Movie

References

External links
  

Television production companies of South Korea
Companies based in Seoul
Mass media companies established in 2016
2016 establishments in South Korea